WGMU-LP, UHF analog channel 39, was a low-powered television station licensed to Burlington, Vermont, United States. It was a satellite of Retro TV affiliate WNMN in Saranac Lake, New York. The station was owned by CEC Media Group. The station had studios on Pine Haven Shores Road in Shelburne. Its transmitter was located in Charlotte. On cable, the station can be seen on Charter channel 18, and Comcast channel 80.

History

WGMU-LP originally signed-on on July 26, 1994 as W39AS but identified themselves on-air as "WWIN". On January 11, 1995, the station joined The WB. In 1998, W39AS changed its call letters to WBVT-LP. In May 1999, WB programming began airing on Fox affiliate WFFF-TV in a secondary nature and WBVT-LP picked up UPN from WWBI-LP. During a period in 2003, the station aired America One programing during the day while showing a "UPN 39" logo in the top-right corner of the screen. The station aired UPN programming during prime time but would not air the network's kid shows. In 2004, WBVT-LP's previous owners (NYN, LLC) were experiencing financial problems which led them to give control of the station to Equity Media Holdings (then known as Equity Broadcasting). The company would buy the station outright in February 2005.

During times of financial trouble and the transition to Equity ownership, there were plenty of technical problems on the channel. There was a point where it would be off-air for days at a time. During this dark period, some area cable systems (including Adelphia in Burlington) temporarily replaced WBVT-LP with Boston's WSBK-TV. In 2005 once the station was in Equity's hands and back in shape, it changed its call letters again to the current WGMU-CA. This was done in order to distinguish itself as a UPN station and no longer a WB affiliate. In Fall 2006, UPN ceased broadcasting and merged with The WB into a new network called The CW. Only one UPN/WB affiliate in each market could join The CW, and WGMU-CA was rejected in favor of WFFF-TV. Instead, it joined MyNetworkTV another new network created by News Corporation for former UPN/WB stations that could not affiliate with The CW. The new affiliation took effect on September 5 and WGMU-CA changed its branding to "My 39".

Before MyNetworkTV affiliation, WGMU-CA did not have a website of its own. The station formerly had a website as WBVT-LP. When it was bought by Equity and changed to WGMU-CA, it got a website at gmupn.com that later disappeared. With the network switch, Equity created a new site for the station located at mytv-burlington.com which is no longer active. On December 8, 2008, Equity Media Holdings filed for bankruptcy. As a result, WGMU-CA was temporarily taken off-the-air. On April 16, 2009, Equity held an auction of all its television stations where WGMU-CA and its repeaters were bought by Convergence Media Group, which was also buying nearby station WCWF (which it recalled WNMN). The sale was approved by the Federal Communications Commission (FCC) in July 2009.

After this, WGMU-CA returned to the air as a satellite of WNMN, which is a Retro Television Network affiliate (vowing that MyNetworkTV became a programming service in 2009 instead of a full TV network). As a separate station, WGMU had studios on Pine Haven Shores Road in Shelburne which are still being used. On cable, the station was seen in Burlington on Comcast channel 7 and in Plattsburgh on Charter channel 18. It was not seen on Vidéotron systems in Montreal, Quebec. The nearest WGMU-CA outlying translator to Montreal, W52CD channel 52 in St. Albans, barely reached the city. Syndicated programming on the station included: Montel, Jerry Springer, Frasier, and Still Standing. It did not air any news or sports programs.

Prior to December 2010, WGMU-CA experienced long term black outs (i.e. dead air; static/snow), lasting several weeks or months, and only broadcast sporadically. There had been no signal since, with the station now silent.

The station formerly had a construction permit for a digital transmitter on channel 49. However, the permit no longer appears in the FCC database as of early 2012.

WGMU-CA and repeater W19BR were downgraded from class A status and reverted to standard low-power stations on October 24, 2012 due to failure to file children's television reports. WGMU-LP had been a class A station since 2002, when the station was still WBVT-LP.

The FCC canceled the licenses of WGMU-LP and repeaters W19BR and WBVT-LP on March 12, 2015 for failure to broadcast for a year; WGMU-LP and W19BR had gone off the air on November 18, 2013, while WBVT shut down four days later. WGMU's former Claremont repeater, WVMA-CD, remains licensed ; that station (formerly W17CI) had been sold to Sound Communications in 2013 and transferred to Novia Communications (a company partially co-owned with Sound) a year later. WVMA-CD is Novia Communications' only media holding outside of its usual territory of upstate New York. It has since been re-licensed to Winchendon, Massachusetts, with its transmitter remaining in New Hampshire.

Repeaters
WGMU-LP operated the following network of repeaters. These transmitters rebroadcast WNMN just like WGMU-LP itself.

Defunct repeaters

References

External links

GMU-LP
Television channels and stations established in 1994
Television channels and stations disestablished in 2013
Defunct television stations in the United States
1994 establishments in Vermont
2013 disestablishments in Vermont
GMU-LP